Samuel Zane Batten (1859–1925) was a Baptist minister.

Biography
He served as a Baptist minister in Morristown, New Jersey, where he preached against alcohol consumption and gambling. He was an adamant proponent of democracy for its Christian appeal. In 1908, he established the Commission on Social Service of the American Baptist Association.

He was a member of the Brotherhood of the Kingdom.

Bibliography
The New Citizenship: Christian Character in its Biblical Ideas, Sources, and Relations (1898)
The Social Task of Christianity: A Summons to the New Crusade (1909)
The Christian State: The State, Democracy, and Christianity (1909)
A Working Temperance Program (1910)
The Industrial Menace to the Home (1914)
The Moral Meaning of War: A Prophetic Interpretation (1918)
The New World Order (1919)
If America Fail: Our National Mission and Our Possible Future (1922)
Building a Community (1922)
Why Not Try Christianity? (1923)

References

1859 births
1925 deaths
Baptist ministers from the United States